Grant Dean Williams (born November 30, 1998) is an American professional basketball player for the Boston Celtics of the National Basketball Association (NBA). He played college basketball for the Tennessee Volunteers. 

Williams was drafted 22nd overall in the 2019 NBA draft by the Celtics. He reached the NBA Finals with the team in 2022.

College career

Williams was an All-Southeastern Conference player as a freshman, sophomore, and junior for the Tennessee Volunteers. He was awarded back-to-back SEC Player of the Year honors for the 2017–18 and 2018–19 seasons, becoming the first player to do so since Corliss Williamson in 1995. Williams led Tennessee as a third seed in the 2018 NCAA tournament and second seed in the 2019 NCAA tournament.

Professional career

Boston Celtics (2019–present)
Williams was selected with the 22nd overall draft pick by the Boston Celtics in the 2019 NBA draft. On July 11, 2019, the Celtics announced that they had signed him to a four-year, $11.8 million rookie-scale contract. On October 23, 2019, Williams made his professional debut, coming off the bench in a loss to the Philadelphia 76ers. On December 4, 2019, he made his first career start in a winning effort against the Miami Heat. In an effort to garner support for teammates making the 2020 NBA All-Star Game, Williams pledged to dye his hair pink if Jaylen Brown, Jayson Tatum, and Kemba Walker all received a selection. However, Williams did not do so as Brown did not make the team. Williams finished his rookie season averaging just over 15 minutes per game in 69 games, 3.4 points per game, and 2.6 rebounds per game.

Upon completion of the 2020–21 NBA season, Williams' second season in the league, he slightly increased his averages in all major statistical categories. He finished the season averaging just over 18 minutes per game, 4.7 points per game, and 2.8 rebounds per game.

On March 21, 2022, Williams scored a then career-high 20 points in a win against the Oklahoma City Thunder. He finished the 2021–22 NBA season with career-best averages with over 24 minutes per game, 7.8 points per game, and 3.6 rebounds per game. On May 15, Williams scored a career-high 27 points in a decisive Game 7 win over the Milwaukee Bucks in the Eastern Conference Semifinals. His performance was highlighted by a 7-for-18 mark from three point range, records for both made threes and three attempts in an NBA Game 7. Williams helped the Celtics reach the NBA Finals, but lost to the Golden State Warriors in 6 games.

On October 26, 2022, Williams was suspended for one game without pay for making contact with a game official during a 102–120 loss to the Chicago Bulls two days earlier.

Career statistics

NBA

Regular season

|-
| style="text-align:left;"| 
| style="text-align:left;"| Boston
| 69 || 5 || 15.1 || .412 || .250 || .722 || 2.6 || 1.0 || .4 || .5 || 3.4
|-
| style="text-align:left;"| 
| style="text-align:left;"| Boston
| 61 || 9 || 18.1 || .437 || .372 || .588 || 2.8 || 1.0 || .5 || .4 || 4.7
|-
| style="text-align:left;"| 
| style="text-align:left;"| Boston
| 77 || 21 || 24.4 || .475 || .411 || .905 || 3.6 || 1.0 || .5 || .7 || 7.8
|- class="sortbottom"
| style="text-align:center;" colspan="2"| Career
| 209 || 35 || 19.4 || .449 || .369 || .775 || 3.0 || 1.0 || .5 || .6 || 5.4

Playoffs

|-
| style="text-align:left;"|2020
| style="text-align:left;"|Boston
| 17 || 0 || 10.0 || .577 || .588 || .700 || 1.5 || .4 || .1 || .3 || 2.8
|-
| style="text-align:left;"|2021
| style="text-align:left;"|Boston
| 5 || 0 || 11.4 || .500 || .500 || 1.000 || 2.0 || .8 || .2 || .8 || 3.4
|-
| style="text-align:left;"|2022
| style="text-align:left;"|Boston
| 24 || 5 || 27.3 || .433 || .393 || .808 || 3.8 || .8 || .3 || .8 || 8.6
|- class="sortbottom"
| style="text-align:center;" colspan="2"| Career
| 46 || 5 || 19.2 || .457 || .427 || .800 || 2.8 || .6 || .2 || .6 || 5.9

College

|-
| style="text-align:left;"| 2016–17
| style="text-align:left;"| Tennessee
| 32 || 29 || 25.4 || .504 || .375 || .667 || 5.9 || 1.1 || .8 || 1.9 || 12.6
|-
| style="text-align:left;"| 2017–18
| style="text-align:left;"| Tennessee
| 35 || 35 || 28.8 || .473 || .120 || .764 || 6.0 || 1.9 || .6 || 1.3 || 15.2
|-
| style="text-align:left;"| 2018–19
| style="text-align:left;"| Tennessee
| 37 || 37 || 31.9 || .564 || .326 || .819 || 7.5 || 3.2 || 1.1 || 1.5 || 18.8
|- class="sortbottom"
| style="text-align:center;" colspan="2"| Career
| 104 || 101 || 28.9 || .516 || .291 || .758 || 6.5 || 2.1 || .9 || 1.5 || 15.7

Personal life
Williams' mother, Teresa Johnson, is an electrical engineer for NASA. His father, Gilbert, is a jazz artist and former college basketball player, who has worked as a bodyguard for musicians, including Prince. He is a cousin of former NBA players Salim and Damon Stoudamire. Turning down offers from Ivy League schools Harvard and Yale, Williams graduated from Tennessee in three years with a degree in business. At Tennessee, he received the C & C Millwright Athletic Scholarship.

Williams threw out the first pitch at the Boston Red Sox game on August 7, 2019.

References

External links
Boston Celtics profile
Tennessee Volunteers profile

1998 births
Living people
All-American college men's basketball players
American men's basketball players
Basketball players from Houston
Boston Celtics draft picks
Boston Celtics players
Power forwards (basketball)
Tennessee Volunteers basketball players